Alison Jackson (née Farkash; born 14 December 1988) is a Canadian professional racing cyclist, who rides for UCI Women's WorldTeam . She rode in the women's team time trial at the 2015 UCI Road World Championships. In July 2021, Jackson received a last minute quota spot to enter the road race competition at the 2020 Summer Olympics.

Early life
Jackson was born and raised on a bison farm in rural Alberta, the second of three children. As a young adult, she competed in triathlon, subsequently being offered a running scholarship at Trinity Western University. After graduating, Jackson made the decision to focus on cycling.

Career
During her time at the team, she won stages at the Tour Cycliste Féminin International de l'Ardèche and the Trophée d'Or Féminin. At the end of the 2022 season, Jackson returned to the now-named  team for the 2023 season, having rode for the team in 2018 and 2019.

Major results
Source: 

2014
 1st Overall Tour de White Rock
1st Stage 1
 Tour de Delta
2nd MK Delta Criterium
6th Brenco Criterium
 9th White Spot / Delta Road Race
2015
 National Road Championships
1st  Criterium
4th Road race
7th Time trial
 1st Heusden
 1st Points classification, Tour of the Gila
 2nd Massemen
 2nd Haasdonk
 3rd Overall Tour de White Rock
 3rd Profronde van Oostvoorne
 4th Ridderronde Maastricht
 5th Team time trial, UCI Road World Championships
 5th De Klinge
 6th Overall Chico Stage Race
1st Stages 1 & 4
 6th Draai van de Kaai
 6th Maria-Ter-Heide
 7th Overall Tour of California
 7th Gastown Grand Prix
 8th Overall Redlands Bicycle Classic
1st Stage 1
 8th Cityronde van Tiel
 10th Grand Prix cycliste de Gatineau
2016
 1st Stage 6 Tour Cycliste Féminin International de l'Ardèche
 1st Stage 1 Chico Stage Race
 1st Stage 2 (TTT) Tour of California
 2nd Overall Tour de Murrieta
 2nd Overall Tour de White Rock
 3rd White Spot / Delta Road Race
 3rd Giro di Burnaby
 3rd PoCo Grand Prix
 4th Overall Valley of the Sun
1st Stages 2 & 3
 5th Team time trial, UCI Road World Championships
 5th Road race, National Road Championships
 5th Gastown Grand Prix
 6th Grand Prix Cycliste de Gatineau
 Winston-Salem Cycling Classic
6th Road race
6th Criterium
 Tour de Delta
6th Brenco Criterium
6th MK Delta Criterium
 8th Overall Cascade Cycling Classic
 8th Overall Trophée d'Or Féminin
1st Stage 3
 9th Chrono Gatineau
 10th Philadelphia Cycling Classic
2017
 1st Romanengo ITT
 1st Stage 1 (TTT) Setmana Ciclista Valenciana
 National Road Championships
3rd Road race
7th Time trial
 8th Team time trial, UCI Road World Championships
2018
 1st Oudenaarde–GP de President
 2nd Grand Prix Cycliste de Gatineau
 5th Winston-Salem Cycling Classic
 6th Overall Belgium Tour
 6th Erondegemse Pijl
 6th GP de Plouay – Bretagne
 8th Overall Women's Herald Sun Tour
 9th Overall Ladies Tour of Norway
 10th White Spot / Delta Road Race
 10th Tour of Guangxi
2019
 1st White Spot / Delta Road Race
 2nd Overall Women's Tour of Scotland
1st Stage 2
 2nd Tour of Guangxi
 5th Overall Women's Tour Down Under
 9th Overall Women's Herald Sun Tour
 9th Amstel Gold Race
2020
 9th Three Days of Bruges–De Panne
2021
 National Road Championships
1st  Road race
1st  Time trial
 1st  Points classification, Ladies Tour of Norway
 5th Dwars door Vlaanderen
 5th Drentse Acht van Westerveld
 6th Road race, UCI Road World Championships
 8th Overall Holland Ladies Tour
1st Stage 1
2022
 1st  Points classification, Tour of Scandinavia
 2nd Road race, National Road Championships
 2nd Drentse Acht van Westerveld
 7th Overall BeNe Ladies Tour
 8th Overall Holland Ladies Tour

References

External links
 

1988 births
Living people
Canadian female cyclists
Cyclists from Alberta
Olympic cyclists of Canada
Cyclists at the 2020 Summer Olympics
Trinity Western University alumni
20th-century Canadian women
21st-century Canadian women